Yishun Sentek Mariners FC is a football club based in Yishun, Singapore, that plays in the National Football League Division 1.

In 2016, then Yakob Hashim, the coach of Yishun Sentek Mariners, had expressed his unhappiness at the lack of financial support the semi-professional leagues received.

History
The club won Division Two of the National Football League in 2014, gaining promotion to the Division One.

Players

Honours
National Football League
Division 2 Champions: 2014
Division 1 Champions: 2017
Singapore FA Cup
Champions: 2018
Runner-up: 2017
NFL Challenge Cup
Champions: 2018, 2019

Seasons

References

Football clubs in Singapore